Colletes thoracicus, the rufous-chested cellophane bee, is a species of cellophane or plasterer, masked, or fork-tongued bee in the family Colletidae. It is found in North America.

References

Further reading

 

Colletidae
Insects described in 1853